Estadio El Soto is a stadium in Móstoles, Madrid, Spain.  It is currently used for football matches and is the home stadium of CD Móstoles URJC.  The stadium holds 14,000 spectators.

References

External links
Stadium information

Football venues in the Community of Madrid
Buildings and structures in Móstoles
Sport in Móstoles